Jörg Albertz (born 29 January 1971) is a German former professional footballer who played as a midfielder. Between 1996 and 1998, he played three international games for the Germany national team.

Career
As both a youth player and apprentice, Albertz played for PSV Mönchengladbach and Borussia Mönchengladbach. His first professional contract was signed in 1990 for Fortuna Düsseldorf. When the team from the Rhineland were relegated to the second tier of the Bundesliga, Albertz moved to Hamburger SV where he soon became the public hero of the team. Two seasons later he became the club captain.

In 1996, Albertz signed for Rangers for £4 million, and he helped them to their ninth Scottish league championship title in a row and scored a famous free-kick against rivals Celtic in January 1997. Albertz became a favourite with the Rangers fans and earned himself the nickname "The Hammer" for his powerful long range shots. After the departure of manager Walter Smith in June 1998, he was frequently left out of the starting line-up by the incoming Dick Advocaat. Despite this, he also won league championship medals in 1999 and 2000.

He returned to Hamburg in 2001. Despite the hype of his return, he was unable to live up to the hopes that people had on his shoulders. Before the beginning of season 2002–03 he transferred to Chinese club Shanghai Shenhua. He initially gained success with them when he won the 2003 league title. In 2003 the Chinese Football Association revoked the league title after it was discovered the Shenhua General manager Lou Shifang had bribed officials to give favourable decisions to Shenhua in games that season.

Having had a moderately successful spell in China, Albertz moved back to Germany in 2004, his re-initiation into the German game coming with Greuther Fürth. On the receiving end of many injuries, he switched to Fortuna Düsseldorf once again, where he retired at the end of the 2006–07 season.

On 11 March 2008, Albertz confirmed he was training with Clyde with a view to a short-term move, to help out Clyde manager and former Rangers teammate John Brown. Albertz signed for Clyde on 14 March 2008.
He made his debut the following day, scoring a trademark free kick in a 1–1 draw with Stirling Albion. He scored Clyde's winning goal with another free kick in an important 2–1 victory over St Johnstone on 25 March, to lift Clyde out of the relegation play-off zone. After helping Clyde stay in the Scottish First Division via the playoffs, Albertz went into retirement once again, after making eight appearances for the club, scoring twice.

Career statistics

Honours
Rangers
 Scottish Premier League: 1996–97, 1998–99, 1999–2000
 Scottish Cup: 1998–99, 1999–2000
 Scottish League Cup: 1996–97, 1998–99

Shanghai Shenhua
 Chinese Jia-A League: 2003 (revoked due to match-fixing scandal)

Individual
SPL Player of the Month: May 2001
Chinese Jia-A League Player of the Year: 2003

References

External links
 
 
 
 

1971 births
Living people
Sportspeople from Mönchengladbach
German footballers
Footballers from North Rhine-Westphalia
Association football midfielders
Germany international footballers
Bundesliga players
2. Bundesliga players
Regionalliga players
Scottish Football League players
Scottish Premier League players
Chinese Super League players
Borussia Mönchengladbach players
Fortuna Düsseldorf players
Hamburger SV players
Rangers F.C. players
Shanghai Shenhua F.C. players
SpVgg Greuther Fürth players
Clyde F.C. players
German expatriate footballers
German expatriate sportspeople in Scotland
Expatriate footballers in Scotland
German expatriate sportspeople in China
Expatriate footballers in China